Rolf Liebermann (14 September 1910 – 2 January 1999), was a Swiss composer and music administrator. He served as the Artistic Director of the Hamburg State Opera from 1959 to 1973 and again from 1985 to 1988. He was also Artistic Director of the Paris Opera from 1973 to 1980.

Life
Liebermann was born in Zürich, and studied composition and conducting with Hermann Scherchen in Budapest and Vienna in the 1930s, and later with Wladimir Vogel in Basel. His compositional output involved several different musical genres, including chansons, classical, and light music. His classical music often combines myriad styles and techniques, including those drawn from baroque, classical, and twelve-tone music.

Liebermann was the director of the Hamburg Staatsoper from 1959 to 1973, and again from 1985 to 1988. During his tenure in Hamburg, he commissioned 24 new operas, including The Devils by Krzysztof Penderecki, Der Prinz von Homburg by Hans Werner Henze, and Help, Help, the Globolinks! by Gian Carlo Menotti. In the intervening years he served as director of the Paris Opera from 1973 to 1980. He died in Paris.

At the inaugural Eurovision Song Contest in 1956, Liebermann acted as the president of the jury; being responsible for moderating and finalising the results of the seven international juries judging the competition.

In 1992 he served on the jury of the Paloma O'Shea Santander International Piano Competition in Spain.

In 1989, he was the head of the jury at the 39th Berlin International Film Festival.

Works
1943 Polyphone Studien for chamber orchestra
1944 Une des fins du monde, cantata for baritone and orchestra after Jean Giraudoux
1945 Chinese Love Songs; Furioso
1947 Swiss Folk Song Suite (Suite über 6 schweizerische Volkslieder)
1949 Music for Orchestra and Reciter; Chinese Song; Symphony No 1
1950 Streitlied zwischen Leben und Tod (Combat Song of Life and Death)
1951 Sonata for piano
1952  (opera). First performance: Basel
1954 Penelope (opera). First performance: Salzburg Festival (George Szell/Schuh/Neher/Anneliese Rothenberger/Walter Berry/Peter Klein (tenor)/Rudolf Schock/Max Lorenz (tenor)/Kurt Böhme/Kurt Equiluz)
1954 Concerto for Jazzband and Symphony Orchestra. First performance: Donaueschingen, cond. Hans Rosbaud. American première: the Sauter-Finegan Orchestra with the Chicago Symphony Orchestra, cond. Fritz Reiner (also recorded for RCA at that time)
1955 The School for Wives (opera). First performance of the one-act version: Louisville, Kentucky
1956 Executive supervisor for the  Eurovision Song Contest 1956
1957 Die Schule der Frauen (opera). European premiere: Salzburg Festival (Szell/Schuh/Neher/Walter Berry/Kurt Böhme/Anneliese Rothenberger/Nicolai Gedda/Christa Ludwig)
1958 Geigy Festival Concerto for Basler drum and orchestra
1959 Capriccio for soprano, violin and orchestra
1964 Concert des Echanges, Swiss National Exhibition, Lausanne
1981 Essai 81 for cello and piano
1984 Ferdinand, parable for speaker and instruments
1987 La Forêt (opera). First performance: Geneva (Tate/Deflo/Orlandi)
1988 Herring Quintet; Cosmopolitan Greetings (Gruntz/Wilson/Ginsberg)
1989 Medea Monologue for soprano, female choir and orchestra
1990 3x1 = CH+X for mezzo-soprano, choir, and orchestra
1992 Freispruch für Medea (opera). First performance: Hamburg 1995
1994 Enigma; Violin Concerto
1995 Piano Concerto
1996 Die schlesischen Weber (text: Heinrich Heine) for mixed choir, string quartet, and piano
1997 Variations on a Theme from Appenzell for five instruments
1998 Mouvance for nine percussion players and piano

References

External links 

 Rolf Liebermann biography and works on the UE website (publisher)
 Works at Sikorski Publishing

1910 births
1999 deaths
Jewish classical composers
Swiss classical composers
Swiss Jews
Musicians from Zürich
Opera managers
Directors of the Paris Opera
Swiss opera composers
Male opera composers
Jewish opera composers
Knights Commander of the Order of Merit of the Federal Republic of Germany
Composers awarded knighthoods
Commandeurs of the Ordre des Arts et des Lettres
Commandeurs of the Légion d'honneur
20th-century classical composers
Jews from Hamburg
Swiss male classical composers
20th-century male musicians
Eurovision Song Contest people
20th-century Swiss composers